James Kyson (born December 13, 1975) is a South Korean-born American actor best known for his television work. Best known for his role as Ando Masahashi on the NBC television series Heroes, his guest appearances on television series include Hawaii Five-0, NCIS: Los Angeles, Sleepy Hollow, Elementary, and Criminal Minds: Beyond Borders.

Early life and education
Kyson was born Lee Ji-Hoon (although his given name was later changed to Jae-Hyeok) in Seoul, South Korea. His father was an electrical engineer. He moved with his family to New York City at age 10, where he later attended The Bronx High School of Science. His English name, James, is derived from James Bond. He studied communications at Boston University with the intent of being a sports broadcaster before later transferring to the New England Institute of Art.

In summer of 2001, Kyson sold his car and bought a one-way ticket to Los Angeles with the intent of entering the acting industry. He enrolled in performing arts classes at a community college while auditioning for roles and working as a SAT tutor to pay the bills.

Acting career

After three years in Los Angeles, Kyson landed his first acting role on the military legal television drama JAG in 2003.

He landed guest roles in hit network television series The West Wing and CSI: Crime Scene Investigation amongst others before being cast as one of his more widely known roles, Ando Masahashi in the sci-fi series Heroes. The role required him to speak Japanese. He later stated that he had taken a semester of Japanese in college and did not find learning the language difficult as it was grammatically similar to Korean, which he is fluent in.

Since Heroes ended, he also guest-starred on Hawaii Five-0, Justified, Animals., Sleepy Hollow, Elementary, and more recently Criminal Minds: Beyond Borders.

His feature films work includes the romantic comedy Another Time, the thriller The Livingston Gardener - and as a mixed martial arts fighter in the action feature Banana Season.

Kyson was a celebrity judge at the Miss Universe 2007 beauty pageant.

Personal life
Kyson is married to singer and neuroscientist Jamee Kyson since 2015.

He is fluent in Korean and learned Japanese to play Ando Masahashi in Heroes.

Filmography
 JAG (2003) – Lieutenant Pak (1 episode, 2003)
 All About the Andersons (2003) – Josh
 Threat Matrix (2004) – Vargas Killer
 The West Wing (2004) – Chinese Translator Zheng
 Doberman (2005) – Johnny
 Heist (2006) – Universal Studio Guide
 On the Rocks (2006) – Donald Park
 Heroes (2006–2010) – Ando Masahashi
 Big Dreams Little Tokyo (2006) – Murakami
 Asian Stories (2006) – Jim Lee
 Las Vegas (2007) – Joon Ho Park
 The Darkness (2007) – voices of Peter Chen, Cops
 Shutter (2008) – Ritsuo
 Mortal Kombat vs. DC Universe (2008) – voice of Shang Tsung
 Akira's Hip Hop Shop (2008) – Akira
 CSI: Crime Scene Investigation (2009) – Korean Translator (1 episode – "Say Uncle")
 White on Rice (2009) – Tim Kim
 Hard Breakers (2009) – Evan
 Necrosis (2009) – Jerry
 How to Make Love to a Woman (2009) – Aaron
 Star Runners (2009) – Lei Chen
 WWII in HD (2009) – voice of Jimmie Kanaya
 Celebrity Ghost Stories (2009) – Himself
 Why Am I Doing This? (2009) – Eric
 Despicable Me (2010) – Additional Voices
 Hawaii Five-0 (2011) – Sean Leung
 Plush (2013) – Coat and Tie Fan
 Grand Theft Auto V (2013) – voice of The Local Population
 Justified (2014) – Yoon
 Ragamuffin (2014) - Matt Gast
 Fourth World (2015) – Legion
 The Livingston Gardender (2015) – Pierce Lawrence
 Animals (2016) – Boss
 School of Rock (2016) – David Kwon
 NCIS: Los Angeles (2016) – James Kang
 Convenience Store Diet (2016) – voice of Jacked Bro
 Preacher (2017) – The Technician (Season 2 episode 6  - "Sokoasha")
 Boone: the Bounty Hunter (2017) – Cameo
 No Trace (2017) – Detective Phil Chung
 Blade of Honor (2017) – John 'Hoss' O'Tekjac
 Sleepy Hollow (2017) – Special Agent Mark Wong
 Criminal Minds: Beyond Borders (2017) – Inspector Joon-Ho Kim
 Elementary (2017) – Joey Ng
 The High Life (2017) – Chevy Lee
 Another Time (2018) – Kal
 Breaking & Exiting (2018) – Peter
 Banana Season (2018) – Sun
 Walk to Vegas (2019) – Wing
 Anthem (2019) – voice of Dr. Harken
 Lovecraft Country (2020) – Byung-Ho (1 episode – "Meet Me in Daegu")
 Next (2020) - Bill Zhai (1 episode - "File #7")

Other activities
Kyson plays basketball for charity celebrity team The Hollywood Knights  and participated in Robbie Williams' Soccer Aid for UNICEF at Manchester Uniteds Old Trafford in England. He is also an Ambassador for the International Organization Good Neighbors and their Water for Life campaign.

Kyson represented the Rest of the World team in 2010 Soccer Aid, a British charity soccer match in aid of UNICEF.

See also 

 Masi Oka — Kyson's co-actor on Heroes

References

External links
 
 
Interview with girl.com on White on Rice

American male film actors
American male stage actors
American male television actors
American male voice actors
American male actors of Korean descent
1975 births
Boston University College of Communication alumni
The Bronx High School of Science alumni
Living people
Male actors from New York City
New England Institute of Art alumni
People from Seoul
South Korean emigrants to the United States